George W. Snow (13 December 1842 – 8 November 1927) was an American politician. Between 1901 and 1905 he was the sixth Lieutenant Governor of South Dakota.

Life
George Snow was born in Posey County, Indiana. Later he moved with his parents to Wisconsin where he attended the public schools. In 1866 he graduated from a commercial college in Madison. In his younger years he worked on his father’s farm and during the Civil War he served in the Union Army, where he participated in various battles. He returned to Wisconsin where he was a clerk in a general store. In 1869 he moved to Springfield in the Dakota Territory, where he worked again as a clerk in a general store. Soon he operated a sawmill and later he was engaged in the real estate business. He also owned several thousand acres of valuable land not only in South Dakota but also in Nebraska, where he was involved in farming. In addition, he got involved in banking and became President of the Bank of Springfield. Before he was one of the founders of that institution.

Politically he joined the Republican Party. He maintained various local offices such as county treasurer or Justice of Peace. In 1885 he was a delegate to the constitutional convention for the planned statehood of South Dakota. In the years 1890 and 1891 and again from 1897 to 1898 he held a seat in the State Senate. In 1900 George Snow was elected to the office of the Lieutenant Governor of South Dakota. After a re-election in 1902 he served in this position between 1901 and 1905 when his second term ended. In this function he was the deputy of Governor Charles N. Herreid and he presided over the State Senate. After his time as Lieutenant Governor Snow continued his previous business activities. He was also a member of various associations and organizations. One of them was the military veteran organization Grand Army of the Republic. He died on 8 November 1927 in Springfield, South Dakota where he resided since 1869.

External links

 The Political Graveyard
 Biography from:  "History of South Dakota" by Doane Robinson, Vol. II (1904)

1842 births
1927 deaths
Lieutenant Governors of South Dakota
South Dakota Republicans
People from Springfield, South Dakota